Oscar Bertone (born 14 October 1967) is an Italian former diver. He competed in the men's 10 metre platform event at the 1988 Summer Olympics.

References

External links
 

1967 births
Living people
Italian male divers
Olympic divers of Italy
Divers at the 1988 Summer Olympics
People from Fossano
Sportspeople from the Province of Cuneo